Nischintapur is a village in West Bengal, India. Administratively it is under Amta II (community development block) of Uluberia subdivision, Haora District, West Bengal.

Demographics 
In the 2001 census, the village of Nischintapur had 2,220 inhabitants, with 1,172 males (52.8%) and 1,048 females (47.2%), for a gender ratio of 894 females per thousand males.

Notes

Villages in Howrah district